Aithe Enti is a 2004 Indian Telugu-language thriller film directed by Soma Vijay Prakash and starring Namitha, newcomer Steven Kapoor, and Mohit Chadda. The film was criticised for adding vulgar scenes to the forty-five minute screenplay.

Plot 

The film follows Sanjay, a man who dreams about a girl he never met named Anjali. When Sanjay finds out that Anjali is married to Veerendra Sharma, he gives a photograph to a professional killer (Malhotra) to kill Sharma. However, Sanjay accidentally gave a photograph of himself to the killer.

Cast 

Namitha as Anjali
Steven Kapoor as Veerendra "Veeru" Sharma
Mohit Chadda as Sanjay
Radhika Chaudhari
Pavan Malhotra as a professional killer
Brahmanandam
M. S. Narayana
Sudhakar
Ali
Raghu Babu
Kallu Chidambaram
Siva Reddy as the boss's son
Duvvasi Mohan
Ranganath as the boss
Vizag Prasad
Soma Vijay Prakash
Telangana Shakuntala
Karate Kalyani
Madhulika
Srinija
Shefali Jariwala in a song

Production 
The film began production under the name The Deal and was initialled planned as a bilingual in Telugu and Hindi. Mumbai-based model Mohit was cast as one of the leads along with Namitha, whose real-life boyfriend, Steven Kapoor, played her husband in the film. Bollywood actress Shefali Jariwala did an item song in the film. The film was directed by Habib Nasir, who left the project midway along with Namitha and Kapoor due to script changes made by Soma Vijay Prakash (the film's producer) to suit the film's low budget. Soma Vijay Prakash took over direction and added a comedy track that involved himself as an actor.

Soundtrack 
Ghantadi Krishna composed the music. Lyrics by Jayasurya, R.D.S. Prakash and Sahiti. Audio released by Supreme Music.

"Edo Kotta Lokam" – Ghantadi Krishna, Nitya Santhoshini
"Muthyamaina"
"Ninnu Choodani"- Smitha
"Ninnu Choodani" (second version) – Parthasarathi, Nishma
"Nuvve Naaku Lokamani" – Unnikrishnan
"Rangeela" – Vijayalakshmi

Release 
The film received negative reviews for its vulgar scenes. Gudipoodi Srihari of The Hindu appreciated "The concept and presentation of the main theme is quite interesting", but criticised how "The criminal part of the main drama, towards the end, is the only saving grace of the film". Jeevi of Idlebrain.com noted that "This film takes the audience for a ride. You can safely avoid watching this flick". Mithun Verma of Full Hyderabad criticised the film and said that "Aithe Enti is a bad movie".

References

External links 

2004 thriller films